The Guns of Normandy: A Soldier's Eye View, France 1944 is a non-fiction book, written by Canadian writer George G. Blackburn, first published in October 1995 by McClelland & Stewart. In the book, the author renders a firsthand account of the Normandy invasion from within the Canadian Forces. The narrative account was called "gripping", given in "the most graphic and authentic detail". The panel of judges who awarded the "Edna Staebler Award for Creative Non-Fiction" called The Guns of Normandy "an outstanding example" of the genre.

Awards and honours
The Guns of Normandy won the 1996 Ottawa Citizen "Book of the Year Award" and received shortlist honours for the '96 "Trillium Award". The book won Blackburn the 1996 "Edna Staebler Award for Creative Non-Fiction" as well, giving him acclaim at the national level.

See also
List of Edna Staebler Award recipients

References

External links
Wilfrid Laurier University, The Guns of Normandy, Excerpt, Retrieved 11/22/2012

Canadian non-fiction books
1995 non-fiction books
1944 in France
McClelland & Stewart books